Ute Polster-Lehmann (10 August 1941 – 11 March 1994) was a German rhythmic gymnast who competed for East Germany. She was the 1967 world all-around silver medalist.

Biography 
Lehmann was born in 1941 in Berlin-Lichterfelde. She appeared in the first ever World Rhythmic Gymnastics Championships in 1963 held in Budapest, Hungary finishing 10th in the all-around. Her second appearance at the 1965 World Championships she finished 8th in the All-around. Lehmann achieved success at the 1967 World Championships in Copenhagen winning the all-around silver medal behind Soviet Elena Karpuchina, and won a bronze medal in rope.

In 1969, she married the opera singer Hermann Christian Polster. She died in 1994 in Leipzig.

References

External links
 Ute Lehmann Sports Bio
 Rhythmic Gymnastics Results

1941 births
1994 deaths
German rhythmic gymnasts
Medalists at the Rhythmic Gymnastics World Championships
People from Lichterfelde (Berlin)
Gymnasts from Berlin